Lyall Austin Dagg (July 27, 1929 – May 14, 1975) was a Canadian curler and World Champion. He is the father of Elaine Dagg-Jackson, who also became a curler. 

He won a gold medal at the 1964 World Curling Championships. Outside of curling, he was employed as an account executive.

Dagg died at the age of 45 from a rare blood disorder. He was inducted into the Canadian Curling Hall of Fame in 2000.

Personal life
Dagg was of Irish, Scottish, English and Dutch descent. Dagg was a former printer, journalist, business editor and public relations director. 

Dagg moved to BC in 1943. He was first employed as a printer, and became a write-reporter and business editor for the Vancouver News-Herald. In 1955 he joined the public relations department for Crown Zellerbach Canada, later becoming director of public relations, and then manager of marketing services in Richmond, British Columbia and then in Kelowna in 1973. Dagg was also involved in the BC Centennial Committee, the Festival of Forestry, the Vancouver Board of Trade, the BC Heart Foundation and the Kelowna Chamber of Commerce.

References

External links

1929 births
1975 deaths
Curlers from British Columbia
World curling champions
Brier champions
Canadian people of Irish descent
Canadian people of Scottish descent
Canadian people of English descent
Canadian people of Dutch descent
Canadian male curlers
Sportspeople from Kelowna
Journalists from British Columbia
Canadian printers
Canadian public relations people